Tynan is a civil parish in Northern Ireland.

Tynan may also refer to:

Places
Tynan, Texas

People
Bill Tynan (born 1940), British Member of Parliament 
Katharine Tynan (1859–1931), Irish writer
Kenneth Tynan (1927–1980), English theatre critic and writer
Ronan Tynan (born 1960), Irish tenor singer
T. J. Tynan (born 1992), American ice hockey player